Labdanum, also called ladanum, ladan, or ladanon, is a sticky brown resin obtained from the shrubs Cistus ladanifer (western Mediterranean) and Cistus creticus (eastern Mediterranean), species of rockrose. It was historically used in herbal medicine and is still used in the preparation of some perfumes and vermouths.

History

In ancient times, labdanum was collected by combing the beards and thighs of goats and sheep that had grazed on the cistus shrubs. Wooden instruments used were referred to in 19th-century Crete as ergastiri; a lambadistrion ("labdanum-gatherer") was a kind of rake to which a double row of leathern thongs were fixed instead of teeth. These were used to sweep the shrubs and collect the resin which was later extracted. It was collected by the shepherds and sold to coastal traders. The resin was used as an ingredient for incense, and medicinally to treat colds, coughs, menstrual problems and rheumatism.

Labdanum was produced on the banks of the Mediterranean in antiquity. The Book of Genesis contains two mentions of labdanum being carried to Egypt from Canaan. The word lot (לט "resin") in these two passages is usually interpreted as referring to labdanum on the basis of Semitic cognates.

Percy Newberry, a specialist on ancient Egypt, speculated that the false beard worn by Osiris and pharaohs may have originally represented a "labdanum-laden goat's beard". He also argued that the scepter of Osiris, which is usually interpreted as either a flail or a flabellum, was more likely an instrument for collecting labdanum similar to that used in nineteenth-century Crete.

Some scholars, such as Samuel Bochart, H.J. Abrahams, and Rabbi Saʻadiah ben Yosef Gaon (Saadya), 882–942, state that the mysterious שחלת (onycha), an ingredient in the holy incense (ketoret) mentioned in the Torah (Exodus 30: 34), was actually labdanum.

Modern uses
Labdanum is produced today mainly for the perfume industry. The raw resin is usually extracted by boiling the leaves and twigs. An absolute is also obtained by solvent extraction. An essential oil is produced by steam distillation. The raw gum is a black or sometimes dark brown, fragrant mass containing up to 20% or more of water. It is plastic but not pourable, and becomes brittle with age. The absolute is dark amber-green and very thick at room temperature. The fragrance is more refined than the raw resin. The odour is very rich, complex and tenacious. Labdanum is much valued in perfumery because of its resemblance to ambergris, which has been banned from use in many countries because it originates from the sperm whale, which is an endangered species. Labdanum is the main ingredient used when making the scent of amber in perfumery. Labdanum's odour is variously described as amber, animalic, sweet, fruity, woody, ambergris, dry musk, or leathery.

See also 

 Labdane

References

Resins
Perfume ingredients
Incense material